Mike Flanagan (born May 20, 1978) is an American filmmaker and partner in Intrepid Pictures. Flanagan is best known for his work in horror films and television series, which has attracted the praise of critics for his directing and lack of reliance on jump scares. Stephen King, Quentin Tarantino, and William Friedkin, among others, have praised him. 

Flanagan's films, all of which he directed, wrote, and edited, include Absentia (2011), Oculus (2013), Hush, Before I Wake, Ouija: Origin of Evil (all 2016), Gerald's Game (2017), and Doctor Sleep (2019). He  also created, produced, and served as showrunner on the Netflix supernatural horror anthology series The Haunting, which consists of The Haunting of Hill House (2018), a season based on Shirley Jackson's novel of the same name, and The Haunting of Bly Manor (2020), a season based on the horror novella The Turn of the Screw by Henry James, both of which he has directed, written, and edited episodes of. Flanagan also created and directed the Netflix horror miniseries Midnight Mass (2021), as well as the teen horror series The Midnight Club and The Fall of the House of Usher.

Flanagan is married to actress Kate Siegel, who has been featured in most of his works since Oculus. They also wrote the screenplay of Hush together.

Early life
Flanagan was born in 1978 in Salem, Massachusetts.  His father was in the United States Coast Guard, and the family moved around often.  Although he only briefly lived in Salem, it left an impression on him, and Flanagan retained an abiding interest in both the Salem witch trials and associated topics, such as ghost stories and horror fiction.  Flanagan eventually ended up in Maryland, where he was a student at Archbishop Spalding High School and later attended Towson University.  He graduated with a BA in Electronic Media & Film and a minor in theater.

Career
Flanagan's student films were more oriented toward melodrama.  He later characterized them as "unfit for public consumption" but said that they were "incredible learning experiences".  His first film directed after graduation, Ghosts of Hamilton Street (2003), was filmed in Maryland and featured local actors, including Scott Graham, whom Flanagan met at Towson.  Graham would go on to star in Flanagan's 2006 short film, Oculus: Chapter 3 – The Man with the Plan, which he made for $1500.

Flanagan originally intended for the Oculus story to be told in a series of short films, but he could not find the financing.  Instead, he shot the chapter that included a back story and used that to demonstrate that he could direct a horror film.  The short proved popular at film festivals, and producers were interested in developing the concept; however, they either wanted to shoot it as a found footage film or rejected Flanagan's stipulation that he direct the feature-length adaptation.  Flanagan  directed Absentia (2011), which was financed through a Kickstarter campaign, in response to this rejection.

Made for $70,000 and filmed in his Glendale, California, apartment, Absentia was released direct-to-video but gained popularity when Netflix offered it on its streaming service.  After the surprise success of Absentia, Flanagan returned to Oculus, which he again shopped around.  Intrepid Pictures took an interest in the concept and agreed to let Flanagan direct.  The feature version of Oculus was filmed in 2012 and released theatrically by Relativity Media in 2014.

After Oculus, Flanagan shot his next film, Before I Wake, in 2013. The film was acquired by Relativity Media in 2014, and was originally scheduled to be released on May 8, 2015, but was pushed back to September 25, 2015 and later pulled from the schedule due to the company's filing for bankruptcy. After a year in bankruptcy court, Relativity then announced the film would be released on April 8, 2016, but did not release the film on the promised date, as the company struggled to get back on its feet.  The film was then scheduled to be released on September 9, 2016, but three weeks prior to that date, Relativity once again pulled the film from the schedule, prompting a public argument between Flanagan and Relativity CEO Ryan Kavanaugh on Twitter. Kavanaugh claimed the Sept 9 date was a "bad date," while Flanagan suggested that Relativity wasn't financially able to release the film. Relativity never did release the film, as Kavanaugh sold Relativity to Singapore-based social networking platform YuuZoo in October 2016. Netflix eventually acquired the rights and released the film in January 2018.

Flanagan wrote and directed Ouija: Origin of Evil, which starred Elizabeth Reaser, Henry Thomas, and Annalise Basso. Production began in September 2015, and the film was released in October 2016, and grossed over $81 million worldwide. Around the same time, it was revealed that Flanagan had been working on a "secret project" called Hush. Written in 2014 and filmed in March 2015, the project was kept confidential until a screening at the Toronto Film Festival. Written by Flanagan and lead actress Kate Siegel, and also starring John Gallagher Jr., Michael Trucco, and Samantha Sloyan, the film had its world premiere at SXSW in March 2016 and was released exclusively on Netflix on April 8, 2016, to positive reviews. In 2017, Flanagan directed, wrote, and edited the psychological horror film Gerald's Game, based on the 1992 novel of the same title by Stephen King. The film was released on Netflix on September 29, 2017, to critical acclaim. King called the film "hypnotic, horrifying and terrific" after watching the rough cut.
 
In 2018, Flanagan created, directed, produced, edited, and wrote the Netflix supernatural horror series The Haunting of Hill House, based on Shirley Jackson's novel of the same name. In 2019, Flanagan wrote and directed the horror film Doctor Sleep, based on the novel of the same name by Stephen King, itself the sequel to his previous novel The Shining. Ewan McGregor stars as the older version of Danny Torrance in the film, which was released in November. In February 2019, The Haunting of Hill House was renewed for a stand-alone second season, titled The Haunting of Bly Manor, based on the novel The Turn of the Screw by Henry James. It premiered in 2020. Around the same time, it was also announced that Flanagan had joined frequent collaborator Trevor Macy as a partner in Intrepid Pictures and that the duo had signed an exclusive overall deal with Netflix to produce television content.

In July 2019, as part of that overall deal, Netflix ordered Flanagan's original horror series Midnight Mass. Flanagan wrote, directed and served as showrunner on the 7-episode series, which was released in September 2021 to critical acclaim after a production delay in 2020 caused by the COVID-19 pandemic.

In May 2020, it was announced that Flanagan would adapt numerous novels by Christopher Pike into a new series, titled The Midnight Club, for Netflix. Flanagan co-created the series and serves as executive producer and showrunner.

Upcoming projects
In April 2021, Flanagan was announced to be developing a film for Universal Pictures based on another Christopher Pike novel The Season of Passage. In October 2021, it was announced that Flanagan will create The Fall of the House of Usher, an eight-episode limited series for Netflix that will be based on the short story of the same name and other works by Edgar Allan Poe. Flanagan will direct four episodes of the series, with the other four being helmed by his longtime cinematographer Michael Fimognari.
In December 2022, Flanagan and his partner production company, Intrepid Pictures signed an first-look overall TV deal with Amazon Studios. Flanagan also owns the television rights to The Dark Tower, a series of fantasy novels written by Stephen King .

Personal life
Flanagan was formerly in a relationship with Absentia actress Courtney Bell, with whom he has a son. Since February 2016, he has been married to actress Kate Siegel, with whom he has two children, one son and one daughter.

Flanagan spent years studying various religions. He described Midnight Mass as a passion project, one that was "deeply personal" and dealt intimately with Flanagan's upbringing in the Catholic Church, and his eventual sobriety and atheism. His father served in the Coast Guard, during which the family lived on Governors Island.

Filmography

Film
Student films

Feature films

Television

Recurring collaborators

References

External links
 

Living people
1978 births
Film directors from Massachusetts
American film editors
American male screenwriters
English-language film directors
Horror film directors
Towson University alumni
People from Salem, Massachusetts